The 1982 Senior League World Series took place from August 16–21 in Gary, Indiana, United States. Santa Barbara, California defeated Orange Park, Florida in the championship game.

Teams

Results

References

Senior League World Series
Senior League World Series
1982 in sports in Indiana